Xymenopsis muriciformis is a species of sea snail, a marine gastropod mollusk in the family Muricidae, the murex snails or rock snails.

Description

Distribution

References

External links
 Rochebrune A.-T. de & Mabille J.. (1889). Mollusques. in: Mission Scientifique du Cap Horn 1882–1883. Tome 6 (Zoologie 2, part 8). Paris, Gauthiers-Villars. H.1-H.129, pls. 1–8

Gastropods described in 1833
Xymenopsis